Špičkovina  is a village in Croatia. It is connected by the D24 highway and R201 railway.

Populated places in Krapina-Zagorje County